Founded in 2019, Volta Trucks manufactures and provides services for zero-tailpipe emission electric trucks. The company's registered offices are Stockholm, Sweden, and London, UK, with significant operations in both countries as well as France, Spain, The Netherlands and Austria. Volta Trucks’ Head Office is in Stockholm, Sweden, with its engineering-led from the UK, and manufacturing facility in Steyr, Austria.  

London and Paris will be the first cities to access the product, the Volta Zero, and the company also has teams across France, Spain, Italy, Germany, Netherlands, the UK, with a recent announcement of expansion into the US market. 

In September 2020, Volta Trucks launched the Volta Zero, a purpose-built, all-electric, 16-tonne vehicle designed for city-centre freight deliveries. The first demonstrator was designed by Astheimer in Warwick UK, and manufactured by Prodrive Advanced Engineering in Banbury, UK.  

In February 2022, Volta Trucks announced that it had raised a further $230 million of new investment. New York-based investment firm, Luxor Capital led the funding round and represents the company's largest single investor, joining previous lead investor, Stockholm-based Byggmästare Anders J Ahlström, as well other key investors including Agility and B-FLEXION. In April 2022, Volta Trucks’ had an order bank of around 6,000 vehicles with a value of circa $1.3billion.

History 
2019 

Volta Trucks was founded in 2019 by Scandavian entrepreneur Carl-Magnus Norden and co-founder Kjell Waloen. Engineering concepting and product validation took place throughout 2019. 

2019 - 2020 

Work on the first demonstrator vehicle started in 2019 and was finished in 2020. In June 2020, Volta Trucks confirmed the first pilot fleet trial of the Volta Zero would be undertaken by Bring and Posten, the Nordic distributor of parcels, cargo, and mail. 

In December 2020 Volta Trucks announced a strategic partnership with Petit Forestier and their 1,000-vehicle order of all-electric refrigerated vehicles, believed to be Europe's largest single order of large electric commercial vehicles.

Early 2021

In February 2021 Volta Trucks announced US EV technology solutions company Proterra as the battery supplier for the Volta Zero.

The company also confirmed the appointment of Meritor as the drivetrain component supplier, claiming that the Volta Zero would be Europe's first commercial vehicle to use an innovative eAxle to drive the rear wheels. Partnerships with other global tier 1 suppliers announced included Bridgestone who supplied tyres to the Volta Zero launch vehicle and pilot fleet. Further confirmations included Carrier Transicold as the supplier of the refrigerated equipment and Paneltex of the cargo boxes. 

n April 2021, Volta Trucks announced the appointment of its new chief executive officer and Executive Chairman. Essa Al-Saleh, former president and CEO of Agility Logistics, and former chairman of the Board of Directors of Volta Trucks, was appointed as CEO. Concurrently, Carl-Magnus Norden, the company's Founder, was appointed as Executive Chairman of the board of directors. 

At the end of June 2021, Volta Trucks confirmed the start of engineering evaluation and development testing of the first prototype Volta Zero at HORIBA MIRA in Nuneaton, UK.

Late 2021

In September 2021, Volta Trucks confirmed that the first Volta Zero vehicles will be manufactured in Steyr, Austria, by Steyr Automotive, formerly MAN Truck and Bus Austria. 

The company then announced the conclusion of its Series B funding round, with €37 million secured in new capital, in September 2021. 

Adam Chassin, former Head of Business for Uber in Europe and the former Head of Strategic Business development for Amazon joined Volta Trucks as its Chief Commercial Officer. 

DB Schenker, one of the largest logistics service providers in European land transport, confirmed an order of almost 1,500 Volta Zero's in November 2021. 

In December 2021, the first road-going Volta Zero Design Verification prototype was completed. 

Early 2022 

In May 2022 Volta Trucks confirmed its entry strategy for products, services and manufacturing, into the North American market. The plan will see the first Volta Zero vehicles operating in Los Angeles by the end of 2023. Initially introducing a ‘Pilot Fleet’ of 100 Class 7 trucks in mid-2023, to be evaluated by US customers, ahead of a roll out of production vehicles in 2024. 

In June 2022, Volta Trucks announced the production of its first Volta Zero vehicle at its manufacturing facility at Steyr Automotive, Austria. The start of series production of customer specification vehicles is due to start in early 2023.

Steyr Automotive has reserved capacity of 14,000 vehicles per year for Volta Trucks from their total available production. The manufacturing the Volta Zero will create 510 jobs, plus 180 jobs in the building of the cargo boxes, in addition to an estimated 2,000 positions within the supply chain. The manufacturing contract has a value of up to €1 billion over its lifetime. https://steyr-automotive.com/en 

The company announced its first customer ‘Studio’ and headquarter building in Paris, in July 2022. The ‘Volta Trucks Studio’ is on the historic Rue Edouard VII, off the Boulevard des Capucines in the 9th Arrondissement of Paris, linking the Madeleine and Opera districts. 

Late 2022 

In October 2022 the company announced that it had signed a letter of intent with Siemens Smart Infrastructure outlining a cooperation to deliver eMobility charging infrastructure and software to Volta Trucks customers. 

Volta Trucks also confirmed the location of its first Volta Trucks Hub in the UK, on White Hart Lane in Tottenham, north London. The facility covers 30,000 sq feet, operating eight workshop bays. The property, managed by LaSalle Investment Management, has a photovoltaic panel system on its roof, converting sunlight into energy for the site, and a passive solar wall, optimising the heating and ventilation of the building. It is also designed with a charging infrastructure to support 50kW fast charging of Volta Zero vehicles while they are being maintained. Overall, the facility has an A+ EPC rating and has been designed to achieve the BREAAM ‘Excellent’ rating.

In November 2022, Karl Viktor Schaller is appointed to the board of directors. Between 2014 and 2019, Karl Viktor Schaller was Executive Vice President, Motorcycle Engineering with BMW AG. Before joining BMW AG, he was a Member of the Executive Board and Chief Technology Officer of MAN Truck and Bus. 

In December 2022 Volta Trucks announced the first implementation of its new all-electric Volta Zero with charging infrastructure to Heppner, creator of transport and logistics solutions in international transport from and to France. The pre-order with deposit from Heppner will see 16 full-electric Volta Zeros operate from the company’s depots in Rungis and La Courneuve in Paris, and Lyon.

Early 2023 

Volta Trucks announced the appointment of Claes Nilsson to its board of directors in early January 2023. Claes Nilsson has previously worked for AB Volvo, where he held the position of President of Volvo Trucks and member of its Executive Board. Prior to this, he was responsible for Volvo Trucks regions in Europe, South America, Asia, and Africa. 

The company also confirmed customer production orders for the first 300 manufacturing slots of its full-electric Volta Zero, with an associated revenue of more than €85 million.

In February 2023 Volta Trucks confirmed the location of a further two service and maintenance hubs in Duisburg, Germany, and Madrid in Spain. The German Volta Trucks Hub covers 3,000m² and incorporates eight service and maintenance bays and twelve external truck parking spaces along with a showroom, office space, conference rooms and the Volta Trucks Academy. In Spain, the hub covers an area of around 2,500m² and will house eight truck parking spaces, four workshop bays providing maintenance and servicing along with a showroom, administration offices, a customer call centre, and the Volta Trucks Academy.

The Volta Zero 
In September 2020, Volta Trucks launched the 16-tonne Volta Zero, the world's first purpose-built, all-electric commercial vehicle designed for city-centre deliveries. The driver sits in a central driving position in a lowered cab to mirror the eyeline of other road users and pedestrians. Symmetrical sliding doors allow access in-and-out of either side of the cab. A glasshouse-style cab provides the driver with a 220 degree field of vision and has been designed to exceed the highest Direct Vision Standard rating of 5 stars by Transport for London. The Volta Zero is fitted with 160-200kWh batteries delivering a range of up to 200 km. Volta Trucks claim that the Volta Zero will have a Total Cost of Ownership (TCO) that is less than the cost the same as petrol and diesel equivalents.

Volta Trucks launched the 16-tonne Volta Zero in September 2020, and confirmed in the same month that Nobl (formally Drinks Cubed), the London-based sustainable drinks brand, had signed the first multi-million-pound order for the supply of a fleet of Volta Zero vehicles into their distribution operations between 2022 and 2023.

In May 2021, the company announced its ‘Road-to-Zero Emissions strategy’ where it revealed three new variants of the Volta Zero will become available alongside the 16-tonne by 2025. Production of the 16-tonne vehicle will be closely followed by the largest 18-tonne and mid-size 12-tonne variants in 2023. A Pilot Fleet of the smaller 7.5-tonne vehicles is expected to be launched for customer trials in the same year, with production commencing in late 2024.

In April 2022, Volta Trucks revealed the design of the 7.5- and 12-tonne variants, which bear a close but evolutionary visual relationship to the larger 16-tonne vehicle. The 7.5 and 12-tonne variants will be visually identical at the front, with the 12-tonne vehicle having a longer chassis and body, and second set of rear wheels and tyres, to accommodate the increased vehicle payload.

Manufacturing 

The first Volta Zeros will be built by Steyr Automotive, Austria, formerly MAN Truck and Bus Austria.  

Volta Trucks have announced they have no plans to build their own factory. They claim there is enough spare capacity in the automotive industry to be able to contract manufacture, rather than build their own production facility, thereby reducing costs, the environmental impact and time to market.

Truck as a Service 

Volta Trucks confirmed that alongside the vehicle, they will offer an optional package called “Truck as a Service” (TaaS). For a monthly fee, TaaS provides customers with access to the all-electric Volta Zero, as well as the vehicle's charging infrastructure, servicing, maintenance, financing, insurance, and training.

In April 2022, Volta Trucks revealed its first ‘Volta Trucks Hub’  which will be in Bonneuil-sur-Marne, Paris. The hub will deliver its Truck as a Service customer-focused operations for the routine servicing of vehicles. A further was announced Tottenham, London in late 2022 with two more in Madrid, Spain and Duisburg, Germany in March 2023.

References 

Swedish companies established in 2017
Battery electric vehicle manufacturers
Car manufacturers of Sweden
Manufacturing companies based in Stockholm
Electric vehicle manufacturers of Sweden